The Monument to the Uprising of the People of Kordun and Banija (simply known as the Petrova Gora Monument) is a World War II monument built on Veliki Petrovac, the highest peak of Petrova Gora, a mountain range in central Croatia. The site of the monument is shared between three municipalities: Gvozd and Topusko, in Sisak-Moslavina County and Vojnić, in Karlovac County.

The monument celebrates the uprising and resistance movement of the people of Kordun and Banija against Nazi fascism and commemorates the victims of Nazism, both civilian victims and fallen resistance fighters.

After the founding of the first partisan units in Kordun and Banija regions in the early summer of 1941, ethnic Serbs fought against Nazism and occupation. This region was also a founding site of the Main headquarters of the  People's Liberation Army of Croatia, the Partisan Hospital was active during the whole war and in 1944 the 3rd session of ZAVNOH was held in Topusko.

The author of the monument is a renowned Croatian sculptor Vojin Bakić. Construction of the monument was completed in 1981.

Work on the monument 

After finishing the Monument to the Victory of the People of Slavonia, the largest postmodern sculpture in the world at the time of its opening, Bakić won the first prize for another major project in 1970, in the second round of competition. In the first competition, the first prize had been won by Igor Toš, but his project was canceled after conflicts around the concept of building the monument. The chairman of the board for the construction of the monument was Vladimir Bakarić. Monument construction lasted for a decade, until it was finally completed in 1981 and officially opened on 4 July 1982.

Monument description 
The Monument is mostly architectural work, made of reinforced concrete and covered with slabs of stainless steel. The interior of the monument was laid out as a museum containing a permanent display related to the National Liberation Movement in Croatia, while its surroundings were designated as a recreational complex. By adding the museum, the monument received an educational exhibition function. At the top of the monument is a point from which one can view towards Slovenia, Bosnia and Zagreb.

Scholar Tonko Maroević notes that Bakić drew its inspiration from its sculpture sliced segments, by which he meant that it was Bakić's "step backwards", since the sculpture was his work from the mid-1970s. Already in the early 1980s Bakić felt fatigue in his work, so this is one of the reasons for seeing models in the earlier sculpture, Maroević concluded.

Devastation after 1991 
According to curator of "Petrova Gora Memorial Park" Miloš Kresojević, after 1991 and beginning of the war antifascist monuments and memorial complexes were devastated and at that time anyone could take whatever they wanted from it. The complex was also used as the military headquarters of JNA and Serbian Army of Krajina, which also led to its devastation. This is visible on the walls of the complex which are full of Chetnik symbols, later replaced by Ustasha symbols and again corrected to Chetnik symbols.   Devastation of the monument continues to date as local people continue stripping the stainless steel plates off the monument. Despite protests by the Antifascist organizations, the local and state authorities both fail to take action against the perpetrators.

In addition, "Transmitters and Communications Ltd." set up a transmitter at the top of the monument, which further undermined its appearance.

Since 2004 the curatorial collective WHW plays an important role in the revitalization and care for the monument. WHW organized two exhibitions in 2007 and 2008 (in Graz and Zagreb) which emphasized the importance of Bakić's legacy. They also initiated the action "Petrova Gora: yesterday, tomorrow, how to think Petrova Gora" in 2013.

In popular culture 
The monument appeared as the artwork of American and New Zealand rock band Unknown Mortal Orchestra's debut self-titled album.

The monument was featured in the New York's Museum of Modern Art exhibition exploring the architecture of the former Yugoslavia, "Toward a Concrete Utopia: Architecture in Yugoslavia, 1948–1980," and it is considered at length in the accompanying volume of the same name.

The monument was used as a setting in season one of Tribes of Europa, a German sci-fi television series produced by Wiedemann & Berg Film Production.  The series was released in 2021. The deteriorating state of the monument contributes to the futuristic dystopian style of the series.

See also 
Petrova Gora Memorial Park
List of Yugoslav World War II monuments and memorials in Croatia

References

External links 

 Spomenik Vojina Bakića na Petrovoj gori oronuli kostur pred raspadom (29 December 2013), Retrieved 7 November 2014.
 Spomenik Database - Petrova Gora Monument educational & historical resource

 Photos of the location from 2017

World War II memorials in Croatia
Postmodern architecture
Buildings and structures completed in 1981
1981 sculptures
Buildings and structures in Karlovac County
Buildings and structures in Sisak-Moslavina County
Yugoslav World War II monuments and memorials
Tourist attractions in Karlovac County
Tourist attractions in Sisak-Moslavina County
Uprising